Mackerrasia is a genus of horse flies in the family Tabanidae.

Species
Mackerrasia aurea (Oldroyd, 1957)
Mackerrasia simplicicornis (Austen, 1912)

References

Brachycera genera
Tabanidae
Diptera of Africa